The 2022–23 season is the ongoing 157th season in the existence of Nottingham Forest and the club's first season back in the top flight of English football since 1998–99. In addition to the Premier League, Forest participated in this season's editions of the FA Cup and the EFL Cup.

Coaching team

Players

Transfers

In

Transfers in

Loans in

Out

Transfers out

Loans out

New contracts

Pre-season and friendlies
On 27 June, Forest announced their pre-season schedule. Two further friendlies were added, against Notts County and Valencia.

During the winter break, Nottingham Forest would face Stoke City.

Competitions

Overview

Premier League

League table

Results summary

Results by round

 1 Matchday 7 (vs. Leeds United) was postponed, alongside all other matches in the Premier League, due to the death of Queen Elizabeth II.

Matches
The Premier League fixtures were released on 16 June 2022 for the forthcoming season.

FA Cup

The Reds were drawn away to Blackpool in the third round.

EFL Cup

Forest entered the competition in the second round and were drawn away to Grimsby Town. Another away tie, against Blackburn Rovers was drawn in the fourth round. In the quarter-finals, Nottingham Forest would travel to face Wolverhampton Wanderers. Over two legs, Nottingham Forest were drawn against Manchester United in the semi-finals.

Statistics

Appearances and goals

|-
! colspan=14 ; text-align:center| Player(s) who left on loan but had featured this season

|}

Goalscorers
Includes all competitive matches. The list is sorted by squad number when total goals are equal. Players with no goals not included in the list.

Assists
Includes all competitive matches. The list is sorted by squad number when total assists are equal. Players with no assists not included in the list.

Disciplinary record
Includes all competitive matches. The list is sorted by squad number when total cards are equal. Players with no cards not included in the list.

Clean sheets
Includes all competitive matches. The list is sorted by squad number when total clean sheets are equal. Numbers in parentheses represent games where both goalkeepers participated and both kept a clean sheet; the number in parentheses is awarded to the goalkeeper who was substituted on, whilst a full clean sheet is awarded to the goalkeeper who was on the field at the start of play. Players with no clean sheets not included in the list.

Awards and nominations

League

Premier League Player of the Month

Premier League Goal of the Month

Premier League Manager of the Month

Cups

Carabao Cup Player of the Round

Carabao Cup Goal of the Round

Injuries
The following first-team players were reportedly ruled out for at least 30 days after suffering an injury during the 2022–23 season.

References

Nottingham Forest F.C. seasons
Nottingham Forest
Nottingham Forest